USR may refer to:

 USRobotics, a technology firm
 USR (Guadeloupe football club), in Sainte-Rose, Guadeloupe
 U.S. Robots and Mechanical Men, a fictional robot manufacturer
 /usr, directory in Unix systems, see Filesystem Hierarchy Standard
 A variant of the Steyr AUG, assault rifle
 Save Romania Union, a Romanian political party
 USR, "User Serviceable Routine", a common BASIC instruction to execute native Machine code
 Upward Sun River site, archaeological site in Alaska
 Uxbridge and South Ruislip, a parliamentary constituency in the United Kingdom held by former Prime Minister Boris Johnson.

See also
 μSR, Muon Spin Rotation or muon spin spectroscopy